Surbakhal is a Maban language of Chad.

References

Maban languages
Languages of Chad